Ken Kagaya (July 15, 1944 – March 7, 2003) was a Japanese painter and writer. He was born in the Republic of China on July 15, 1944, and raised in Japan from 1945. He graduated from Faculty of Agriculture, Tohoku University. He died on March 7, 2003.

His father was Toshio Kagaya, a former Parliamentary Secretary for the Japanese Government, mining engineer, graduate of Akita University and mathematician. His mother was Sumino Kagaya.

日本画家、作家。中華人民共和国で生まれる(1944年)。東北大学農学部卒業。（1944年7月15日～2003年3月7日）

References

External links

1944 births
2003 deaths
Japanese writers
20th-century Japanese painters